The Batman Bridge is a modern road bridge that carries the Batman Highway across the Tamar River, between Whirlpool Reach, Hillwood at its eastern end and Sidmouth / Deviot midpoint at its western end, in north Tasmania, Australia. The bridge connects the Batman Highway with the West Tamar Highway (state route A7) and the East Tamar Highway (state route A8). The bridge overlooks the Deviot Sailing Club and is named in honour of John Batman, a Launceston businessman and co-founder of Melbourne.

Design features
Built between 1966 and 1968, it was the first cable-stayed bridge in Australia and among the first such bridges in the world. The tower is on the west bank of the Tamar river, on a solid dolerite rock base which carries 78% of the weight of the main span. The east bank is soft clay not capable of supporting a bridge. A causeway carries the highway across this softer base, supported by four piers built on piles driven up to  into the clay. The bridge deck is constructed of steel.

Gallery

References

External links
 Side view of Batman Bridge shows slanted A-frame support tower.
 
 

Cable-stayed bridges in Australia
Road bridges in Tasmania
Bridges completed in 1968
Tamar River
1968 establishments in Australia